In Armenian folklore, the Lake Van Monster is a lake monster said to live in Lake Van in eastern Turkey.

History
The Armenian chroniclers Movses Khorenatsi and Anania Shirakatsi wrote about vishaps (water dragons in Armenian mythology) living in Lake Van. According to the legend, the god Vahagn, the vishapakagh ("reaper of vishaps"), would plunge into Lake Van to drag out any vishap that had grown large enough to devour the world. Scholar James Russell considers that this legend is an Armenian adoption of Urartian myths concerning the combat of the god Teisheba with the water monster Ullikummi. Russell writes that into the modern period, the Armenians of the Van basin would refer to the sudden storms that arise on the lake as vishap kami (վիշապ քամի, dragon wind).

A story in the Ottoman newspaper Saadet of April 29, 1889, recounted that a creature had dragged a man into lake Van. Following reports of the incident, the Ottoman government sent an official scientific survey group to the lake who failed to spot the creature. 

Russell discounts a connection between their belief about lake vishaps and the 1990s sightings of a lake creature, considering that any folk beliefs amongst the Kurdish population are likely to be affected more by stories about lake monsters in popular Western culture than any surviving Armenian traditions. He also recounts that Kurds he met in Van in 1994 and 1997 considered the lake monster story to be a "commercial ploy and a farce".

In 1997 a local man called Ünal Kozak claimed to have captured the monster on video which was sent for analysis. Academic Mustafa Y. Nutku has written a book about the creature, together with Kozak.

Kozak's video is under constant criticism, with questions like why it never pans left, possibly because of a boat that may have carried the creature. Or why the monster only goes straight, instead of curving through the water. Even criticism as to why the breathing is not in and out, but a continuous release, much like the effects of an air hose.

A 4-meter high statue based on reported sightings has been erected to its honor in Van, Turkey.

Skeptics point out that the region would benefit from tourist revenue and a hoax might attract visitors.

Cultural impact
The former Prime Minister of Turkey and poet Bülent Ecevit wrote a poem titled "Van Gölü Canavarı" (Lake Van Monster in Turkish language).

The Lake Van Monster appears in The Secret Saturdays episode "The Unblinking Eye". This version resembles a Mosasaurus-like creature.

Animal X (an Australian television show) season 1, episode #3 features the Van Lake Monster.

Josh Gates and his team search for the Van Lake monster on Destination Truth. Season 3, episode 305 "Alien Mummies/Van Lake Monster".

Footage claimed to be of the cryptid was shown on the TV Series Paranormal Caught on Camera.

See also

Loch Ness Monster

References

Van, Turkey
Bitlis
Turkic legendary creatures
Water monsters